First Prize may refer to:

 First Prize (music diploma)
 First Prize (album), an album by George Gruntz's Concert Jazz Band
 First Prize!, an album by Eddie Daniels